Hot Loser is the title of Veal's first album. The album was released in 1996 in Canada.

Track listing 
"Sugar Pants" (3:17)
"Mexico Texaco" (4:15)
"Hot Loser, Part 1" (2:23)
"Cauchemar" (2:59)
"In Bed With the Pope" (2:54)
"Down Again" (4:40)
"Cheesecake" (6:01)
"Nails & Snails" (4:00)
"Two Heads" (3:24)
"Almond Joy" (4:29)
"Girlfriend" (3:19)
"Apple" (0:54)

1996 albums
Veal (band) albums